Addison Teague is a sound editor who has done sound editing on 42 films since 1993. He was nominated for an Academy Award during the 83rd Academy Awards for the film Tron: Legacy. This was for Best Sound Editing, his nomination was shared with Gwendolyn Yates Whittle.

He also is a member of Skywalker Sound.

Selected filmography
The Secret Life of Pets 2 (2019)
Ant-Man and the Wasp (2018)
Ralph Breaks the Internet (2018)
Zootopia (2016)
The Amazing Spider-Man 2 (2014)
Big Hero 6 (2014)
The Lone Ranger (2013)
The Amazing Spider-Man (2012)
Rango (2011)
Tron: Legacy (2010)
Avatar (2009)
Indiana Jones and the Kingdom of the Crystal Skull (2008)
Pirates of the Caribbean: At World's End (2007)
Pirates of the Caribbean: Dead Man's Chest (2006)
Munich (2005)
War of the Worlds (2005)
Hellboy (2004)
The Lord of the Rings: The Return of the King (2003)
Pirates of the Caribbean: The Curse of the Black Pearl (2003)
The Ring (2002)
Lara Croft: Tomb Raider (2001)
The Mexican (2001)
Mystery Men (1999)
Play It to the Bone (1999)

References

External links

Sound editors
Living people
Year of birth missing (living people)